Aco Vasiljević (born 25 September 1973) is a retired Serbian football striker.

References

External links
 

1973 births
Living people
Serbian footballers
FK Borac Čačak players
FK Obilić players
OFK Beograd players
FC Metalurh Zaporizhzhia players
Närpes Kraft Fotbollsförening players
Helsingin Jalkapalloklubi players
Association football forwards
Serbian expatriate footballers
Expatriate footballers in Ukraine
Serbian expatriate sportspeople in Ukraine
Expatriate footballers in Finland
Serbian expatriate sportspeople in Finland